Windswept may refer to:

 Windswept (song), a song performed by Bryan Ferry
 Windswept (Steuben, Maine), the summer house of writer Mary Ellen Chase
 Windswept (novel), a book by Mary Ellen Chase
 Windswept Acres-Powers House
 Windswept Farm
 Windswept House: A Vatican Novel
 Nematoceras dienemum, also known as the "windswept helmet orchid"